Sophie, Hereditary Princess of Liechtenstein, Countess of Rietberg (Sophie Elisabeth Marie Gabrielle; 28 October 1967) was born a member of the House of Wittelsbach, with the courtesy title of Duchess in Bavaria, and second in line for the Jacobite succession. She is married to Alois, Hereditary Prince and Regent of Liechtenstein.

Early life and education
Sophie was Duchess Sophie in Bavaria born in Munich, the eldest of the five daughters of Prince Max, Duke in Bavaria, and Princess Elisabeth, Duchess in Bavaria (née Countess Douglas), as well as a patrilineal great-great-granddaughter of the last King of Bavaria, Ludwig III. She was born in Munich on 28 October 1967 and baptised as Sophie Elizabeth Marie Gabrielle in the chapel of her family's Kreuth home on 18 November. Her godparents were her maternal aunt the Duchess of Marlborough and Princess Anna Gabriele of Wrede.

Sophie spent her childhood together with her parents and sisters in Wildbad Kreuth. From 1978 to 1980, Sophie attended the Girls' Home Primary School of the English Lady in Heiligenstadt. She then moved to the Girls' Secondary Boarding School Hohenburg in Lenggries. Sophie then studied history and English language and literature at the Catholic University of Eichstätt-Ingolstadt. She also attended Inchbald School of Design in London.

Marriage and children
Duchess Sophie in Bavaria met Alois, Hereditary Prince of Liechtenstein at her cousin's birthday party in Munich. The couple married  on 3 July 1993 at Cathedral of St. Florin in Vaduz, Liechtenstein. They lived in London from September 1993 until May 1996, and have since then resided in Vaduz, Liechtenstein. They have four children:
 Prince Joseph Wenzel Maximilian Maria of Liechtenstein, Count of Rietberg (born 24 May 1995 at Portland Hospital in London). Educated at Malvern College.
 Princess Marie Caroline Elisabeth Immaculata of Liechtenstein, Countess of Rietberg (born 17 October 1996 in Grabs, Canton of St. Gallen). Graduated from Parsons Paris School of Art and Design in 2020.
 Prince Georg Antonius Constantin Maria of Liechtenstein, Count of Rietberg (born 20 April 1999 in Grabs). He attended Malvern College and graduated in 2017. He then studied at the University of St. Gallen and continued his education at the ESCP Business School. Professionally known as Georg Liechtenstein, he works as a visiting analyst at Atlantic Labs in Berlin.
 Prince Nikolaus Sebastian Alexander Maria of Liechtenstein, Count of Rietberg (born 6 December 2000 in Grabs).

She became a naturalized Liechtenstein citizen after her marriage.

Illness

At the beginning of 2003, it was made public that Sophie had been diagnosed with a benign brain tumor, from which she has recovered.

Activities
Hereditary Princess Sophie serves as a patron for many organizations and events, often relating to children, education and the arts. She regularly visited social institutions such as hospitals, nursing homes and auctions. The Hereditary Princess often accompanies her husband on foreign visits, as well as many events within Liechtenstein itself.

In 2006, the Hereditary Princess founded the Sophie von Liechtenstein Stiftung für Frau und Kind (Sophie of Liechtenstein Foundation for Woman and Child). The foundation's purpose is to give women who unintentionally became pregnant a more positive life perspective for themselves and their children. The foundation have three office in Liechtenstein, Vorarlberg and St. Gallen and funded by the Liechtenstein princely family and by private donations. The Hereditary Princess serves as president and trustee. Sophie also founded a pregnancy counseling service named schwanger.li in Schaan, Buchs, and Feldkirch. In April 2022, the foundation and Liechtenstein Red Cross launch the "Liechtenstein Family Network" project to support parents with young children from the age of 0 to 5 years in order to promote healthy development of children.

Hereditary Princess Sophie served as a president of the Liechtenstein Red Cross since 2015. In March 2022, as president of the Red Cross, Hereditary Princess Sophie was interviewed by Radio Liechtenstein where she talk about Liechtenstein contribution to the International Red Cross's Ukraine relief funds during Russian invasion of Ukraine. She's also a patron of the Liechtenstein Animal Welfare Association. In addition, she supports Caritas Liechtenstein, an organisation provides financial support to those facing severe financial troubles. She also visited Gamander Children's Home, a shelter home for orphaned and abandoned children. In September 2022, Sophie became the patron of the Heilpädagogische Zentrum in Liechtenstein (Special Education Center in Liechtenstein).

Titles, styles, and honours
 	
From her birth in 1967, Sophie was styled HRH Princess Sophie of Bavaria. In 1973, her father inherited the family name and style Duke in Bavaria from his great-uncle Duke Ludwig Wilhelm who had adopted him as heir in 1965; Sophie was then styled as HRH Duchess Sophie in Bavaria, Princess of Bavaria. On her marriage in 1993, she became HRH The Hereditary Princess of Liechtenstein, Countess of Rietberg, the Principality of Liechtenstein recognising and retaining her use of the style Royal Highness.

National honours

  Bavaria : Dame of Honour of the Order of Theresa.
  Bavaria : Dame of the Order of Saint Elizabeth.
  : Knight Grand Star of the Order of Merit of the Principality of Liechtenstein.

Foreign honours
  : Grand Decoration of Honour in Gold with Sash for Services to the Republic of Austria (20 March 2018).
  : Recipient of the King Willem-Alexander Inauguration Medal (30 April 2013).
  : Recipient of the 70th Birthday Badge Medal of King Carl XVI Gustaf (30 April 2016).

Ancestry

See also
 Princely Family of Liechtenstein
 Jacobite Succession

References

External links
Hereditary Princess Sophie - official website of the Princely House of Liechtenstein

1967 births
Living people
Nobility from Munich
German people of Croatian descent
House of Wittelsbach
Hereditary Princesses of Liechtenstein
Liechtenstein people of Swedish descent
Liechtenstein people of Croatian descent
Liechtenstein Roman Catholics
Duchesses in Bavaria
Bavarian princesses

Recipients of the Grand Decoration with Sash for Services to the Republic of Austria